The 2015 FIBA Europe SuperCup Women was the 5th edition of the FIBA Europe SuperCup Women. It was held on 6 and 7 October 2015. After being discontinued in the year 2014, it resumed with a Final Four format with the two finalists of the Euroleague Women and the EuroCup Women. All games were played in Braine-l'Alleud, Belgium.

Bracket

Semifinals
All times are CET (UTC+1).

Semifinal 1

Semifinal 2

Match for 3rd place

Final

References

External links
 SuperCup Women

2015
2015–16 in European women's basketball
2015–16 in Belgian basketball
2015–16 in Czech basketball
2015–16 in Russian basketball
2015–16 in French basketball
International basketball competitions hosted by Belgium
Braine-l'Alleud
2015 in Belgian women's sport